The Giro del Lago Maggiore, also known as GP Knorr, was a one-day road cycling race held annually near Lake Maggiore in Switzerland. The last two editions of the men's race were part of the UCI Europe Tour in category 1.2.

Winners

Men

Women

References

Men's road bicycle races
Recurring sporting events established in 1982
1982 establishments in Switzerland
Defunct cycling races in Switzerland
UCI Europe Tour races
Cycle races in Switzerland
2006 disestablishments in Switzerland
Recurring sporting events disestablished in 2006
2009 disestablishments in Switzerland
Recurring sporting events disestablished in 2009